Berthasaura (meaning "Bertha's lizard") is a genus of noasaurid ceratosaurian theropod dinosaur from the Cretaceous Goio-Erê Formation of Paraná, Brazil. The type and only species is Berthasaura leopoldinae.

Discovery and naming 
Between 2011 and 2015, paleontologists working at the Cemitério dos Pterossauros site near Cruzeiro do Oeste discovered the skeletons of the pterosaurs Caiuajara and Keresdrakon as well as remains of small theropods. One of these was in 2019 named and described as Vespersaurus but a second species proved to be present.

In 2021, the type species Berthasaura leopoldinae was named and described by Geovane Alves de Souza, Marina Bento Soares, Luiz Carlos Weinschütz, Everton Wilner, Ricardo Tadeu Lopes, Olga Maria Oliveira de Araújo and Alexander Wilhelm Armin Kellner. The generic name Berthasaura refers to the scientist and women's rights activist Bertha Maria Júlia Lutz, while the specific name honors Maria Leopoldina, the first Empress of Brazil; the bicentennial of Brazil's independence was in 2022, close to when the dinosaur was described. Indirectly this also refers to the Imperatriz Leopoldinense samba school; for the 2018 carnival, they developed the theme of Uma noite real no Museu Nacional (Portuguese: A real night in the National Museum); in September of that year a catastrophic fire would destroy much of its collection.

Description 

The holotype, MN 7821-V, is a nearly complete disarticulated skeleton excavated between 2011 and 2014 and is one of the most complete dinosaurs known from the Cretaceous Brazil, preserving the most complete axial series of any noasaurid known to date. Its toothless, short beak suggests it was a herbivore or at least an omnivore, unlike most other ceratosaurs except for adult Limusaurus. Because the holotype represents an immature individual, it has been suggested that Berthasaura was herbivorous throughout its entire life, unlike Limusaurus.

Classification 
Berthasaura was placed by de Souza and colleagues as the basalmost noasaurid, distantly related to Limusaurus.

Paleoenvironment 
Berthasaura lived in the Goio-Erê Formation, which was an ancient desert. Its dating is uncertain; de Souza and colleagues believe it was deposited during the Aptian-Albian, but a Late Cretaceous date has also been proposed. Other animals recovered from this formation include the pterosaurs Caiuajara and Keresdrakon, as well as the lizard Gueragama.

References 

Abelisaurs
Late Cretaceous dinosaurs of South America
Cretaceous Brazil
Fossil taxa described in 2021